Iosco Township is a civil township of Livingston County in the U.S. state of Michigan. The population was 3,801 at the 2010 census, up from 3,039 at the 2000 census.

Community
Parkers Corners, also Iosco, is an unincorporated community in the township at West Iosco and Bradley roads..

Geography
Iosco Township is in western Livingston County, bordered to the west by Ingham County. The township is drained by north-flowing headwaters of the Red Cedar River, leading to the Grand River and eventually Lake Michigan.

Demographics
As of the census of 2000, there were 3,039 people, 921 households, and 796 families residing in the township. The racial makeup of the township was 94.83% White, 0.07% African American, 0.49% Native American, 0.59% Asian, 2.90% from other races, and 1.12% from two or more races. Hispanic or Latino of any race were 3.72% of the population.

There were 921 households, out of which 47.9% had children under the age of 18 living with them, 79.0% were married couples living together, 4.1% had a female householder with no husband present, and 13.5% were non-families. 9.8% of all households were made up of individuals, and 2.5% had someone living alone who was 65 years of age or older.  The average household size was 3.19 and the average family size was 3.40.

In the township the population was spread out, with 32.6% under the age of 18, 7.4% from 18 to 24, 32.9% from 25 to 44, 22.0% from 45 to 64, and 5.0% who were 65 years of age or older.  The median age was 33 years. For every 100 females, there were 108.6 males.  For every 100 females age 18 and over, there were 102.5 males.

The median income for a household in the township was $63,808, and the median income for a family was $65,156. Males had a median income of $49,191 versus $28,889 for females. The per capita income for the township was $20,675.  About 3.2% of families and 6.6% of the population were below the poverty line, including 4.8% of those under age 18 and 12.0% of those age 65 or over.

References

1838 establishments in Michigan
Populated places established in 1838
Townships in Livingston County, Michigan
Townships in Michigan